Kenneth Gulliver (14 August 1913 – 11 June 2001) was an Australian cricketer. He played twelve first-class matches for New South Wales between 1936/37 and 1945/46.

See also
 List of New South Wales representative cricketers

References

External links
 

1913 births
2001 deaths
Australian cricketers
New South Wales cricketers